Sosnovka is a town in Vyatskopolyansky District of Kirov Oblast, Russia, located on the left bank of the Vyatka River,  south of Kirov, the administrative center of the oblast. Population:

History
It was first mentioned in 1699. At the beginning of the 20th century, Sosnovka developed as an industrial village with a sawmill and later with a cable rope factory. In 1938, the village was granted work settlement status, and in 1962—town status.

Administrative and municipal status
Within the framework of administrative divisions, it is incorporated within Vyatskopolyansky District as the Town of Sosnovka. As a municipal division, the Town of Sosnovka is incorporated within Vyatskopolyansky Municipal District as Sosnovskoye Urban Settlement.

References

Notes

Sources

Cities and towns in Kirov Oblast